The Mahindra Scorpio is a mid-size SUV manufactured by the Indian automaker Mahindra & Mahindra since 2002. It was Mahindra's first model to be built for the global market.

The Scorpio was conceptualized and designed by the in-house integrated design and manufacturing team of Mahindra & Mahindra. The car has been the recipient of three Indian awards, including the "Car of the Year" award from Business Standard Motoring as well as the "Best SUV of the Year" and the "Best Car of the Year" awards, both from BBC World's Wheels.

Development
Prior to the mid-1990s, Mahindra & Mahindra was an automobile assembly company. The company manufactured Willys Jeeps and its minor modified versions, with modifications carried out in India. In 1996, the company planned to enter the SUV segment with a new product that could compete globally. Since M&M did not have the technical knowhow to handle such an ambitious product, they devised an entirely new concept among Indian auto companies. Roping in new executives who had worked in the auto industry in western countries, such as Pawan Goenka and Alan Durante.

The new Mahindra Scorpio SUV had all of its major systems designed directly by suppliers, with the only inputs from Mahindra being design, performance specifications and program cost. The design and engineering of the systems were carried out by suppliers, as well as testing, validation, and materials selection. Sourcing and engineering locations were also chosen by suppliers. The parts were later assembled in a Mahindra plant under the Mahindra badge, being a well-known brand in India. Using this method, the company was able to build from scratch a new vehicle with virtually 100 percent supplier involvement from concept to reality, at a cost of Rs 600 crore ($120 million), including improvements to the plant. The project took five years to move from concept to final product. The cost was estimated in 2002 to be Rs 550 crore.

mHawk Engine
The mHawk diesel engine is a VTG-turbocharged and intercooled four-cylinder that displaces 2.2-litres. It has a 85 mm × 96 mm (3.35 in x 3.78 in) cylinder bore and piston stroke. A Bosch common-rail direct-injection system with solenoid injectors is used. The mHawk is equipped with chain-driven overhead camshafts and hydraulic lash adjusters; its compression is ε=16.5…18.5, depending on the model.

First generation (2002)

Pre-facelift (2002–2006) 
The Mahindra Scorpio was first launched in India on 20 June 2002. Soon after its success, the Mahindra Scorpio was later received a minor update to include plush seats, rear center armrest, dual-tone exterior color, and various minor changes.

The vehicle was sold in Europe as the Mahindra Goa with first sales in Italy in 2003. In 2006, Mahindra announced that Scorpios sold in Russia will be made as kits with a joint venture partner.

First facelift (2006–2009) 

In April 2006, Mahindra launched the first facelift of the Scorpio, marketed as the All-New Scorpio. At the Auto Expo 2006 in Delhi, Mahindra also showcased their future plans on the Scorpio model by showcasing a hybrid Scorpio with a CRDe engine and a Scorpio based on a pickup truck. The hybrid, the first such vehicle developed in India, was developed by Arun Juara, a former employee of Ford. His senior, Pawan Goenka, a former engineer at GM, heads Mahindra's automotive division and oversees the Scorpio project. A pickup truck version of the Scorpio was launched in India in June 2007, known as the Scorpio Getaway. On 21 September 2008, the Scorpio was updated with a 6-speed automatic transmission.

Second facelift (2009–2014) 

The second facelift of the Mahindra Scorpio was largely cosmetic, with key changes including the headlight housings, bonnet and bumper designs. There were also minor increases in power and torque.

On 14 April 2009, Mahindra revealed a concept of a diesel-electric hybrid version of their Scorpio SUV at the 2008 SAE World Congress.

The Mahindra Scorpio Getaway was launched in Australia in mid-2009, marketed there as the Mahindra Pik-Up. It received additional safety features compared to the Indian model, such as ABS brakes and airbags in an attempt to raise its rating to a minimum of 3 stars from the current 2 star ANCAP rating. The 2012 model scored 6.6 points out of a possible 16, giving it a 3-star ANCAP rating.

Third facelift (2014–2022) 
The Mahindra Scorpio received its facelift on 25 September 2014, featuring a redesigned front and rear fascias and a new dashboard. A revised automatic variant of the Scorpio was launched in 2015 and automatic transmission was discontinued in 2018 due to the launch of the Scorpio S11.

Mahindra Scorpio Classic (2022–present) 
The current generation Scorpio will continue at the name of "Scorpio Classic" in two variants which is S and S11. Mahindra also launched the Scorpio Classic in India on 19th August 2022. The new Mahindra Twin Peaks logo, reserved for Sport Utility Vehicles, is used, thereby replacing the old logo.

Safety 
The Scorpio for India with no airbags and no ABS received 0 stars for adult occupants and 2 stars for toddlers from Global NCAP in 2016 (similar to Latin NCAP 2013).

Second generation (Z101; 2022) 

 
The next generation of the Scorpio was introduced in 27 June 2022 by Mahindra & Mahindra. It carries an "N" badge and is named Scorpio-N.

There is a complete overhaul in design, and the size of the new SUV is larger than its previous avatar. The petrol motor has two variants 2.2 liters naturally aspirated and 2.0-liter turbocharged. The diesel powertrain comes in two options one churning out  power and  torque and another  power and  torque. The petrol powertrain will come in one option with a  power and  torque. The SUV is also equipped with a shift on-fly 4-wheel drive system.

The cosmetics changes consists of DRL placed with the fog lamp instead of headlights. The Scorpio-N is offered in 6- and 7-seat layouts. It will have an 8-inch infotainment system powered by Sony audio with dual-zone climate control, 4xplor-4x4 and a electric sunroof.

Safety 
Mahindra Scorpio-N Rated 5 star adult safety and 3 Star Child safety in Global NCAP under its new protocol in H2 2022.

See also

References

External links

2010s cars
Cars introduced in 2002
Scorpio
Mid-size sport utility vehicles
Pickup trucks
ANCAP large off-road